The Mula is a river in Murcia, Spain. The river's source is located in Bullas., tributary of the River Segura on its right bank.

See also 
 List of rivers of Spain
 Mula River (India), a river in India
 Mula River (Pakistan), a river in Pakistan

References

Rivers of the Region of Murcia